This page lists the enlisted ranks and insignia of NATO member armies. For the comparison chart of the commissioned officers, see Ranks and insignia of NATO armies officers.

Other and enlisted ranks (OR 1–9)

See also
 NATO
 Ranks and insignia of NATO
 Ranks and insignia of NATO armies officers
 Ranks and insignia of NATO air forces enlisted
 Ranks and insignia of NATO air forces officers
 Ranks and insignia of NATO navies enlisted
 Ranks and insignia of NATO navies officers

Notes

References

External links
NATO Ranks and Grades—Official NATO Ranks / Pay Grades Table
STANAG 2116 (Edition 5)
History of NATO – the Atlantic Alliance—UK Government site
NATO codes for grades of military personnel from STANAG 2116
Nato Army/Navy/AirForce Enlisted Ranks from visualinformation.info

Military ranks of NATO